William Duguid may refer to:

People 

 William Duguid Geddes
 William Fondleroy Duguid